is a former Japanese football player. She played for Japan national team.

National team career
Iwaya was born on June 1, 1964. In June 1981, when she was 17 years old, she was selected for the Japan national team for the 1981 AFC Championship. At this competition, on June 13, she debuted against Indonesia and Japan won this match (1-0). That was the Japan team's first victory. She played two games for Japan, including that competition in 1981.

National team statistics

References

1964 births
Living people
Japanese women's footballers
Japan women's international footballers
Shimizudaihachi Pleiades players
Women's association football goalkeepers